Pikes Peak granite is a 1.08 billion year old Late-Precambrian geologic formation found in the central part of the Front Range of Colorado. It is a coarse-grained pink to light red syenogranite with minor gray monzogranite, and it has a distinctive brick-red appearance where it outcrops. The granite gets its name from the  Pikes Peak, which is made up almost entirely of this rock.

Origin
The Pikes Peak granite was emplaced in Colorado's central Front Range from three major intrusive centers near what is now Pikes Peak, Buffalo Park and the Lost Creek Wilderness. It is the geochemically potassic series of plutons compromising most of the Pikes Peak batholith, a batholith formed of two major types of plutons, the potassic Pikes Peak granite and later plutons, plus late stage sodic syenite and granite plutons. Both the batholith and the Pikes Peak granite are A-type, meaning granites that originate in anorogenic, or non-mountain building, tectonic settings, with an alkaline geochemistry and arising from more anhydrous magmas.

Erosion

Over the next 300 million years, the now cooled granite was gradually exposed through erosion of the overlying rocks. About 700 million years ago, the granite was exposed at the surface and, for another 300 million years, it was subject to extensive weathering. Since no sediments were being deposited, there is a large time gap in the geological record. This gap is part of a more generalized gap called the Great Unconformity.

About 510 million years ago, the granite was again subject to deposition and was gradually buried by thick layers of sediment. Over the next 450 million years, the area was covered by seas, reefs, beaches, sand dunes and mountain streams which laid down more than 15,000 feet (4,500 m) of sediment.

About 60 million years ago, parts of the Western U.S. were subjected to a series of uplifts, known as the Laramide orogeny, that eventually formed the modern Rocky Mountains and raised Pikes Peak to its current height. Pikes Peak, like other portions of Colorado Rockies is still being uplifted today as a part of larger tectonic processes affecting the Western United States.

Today, the Pikes Peak Batholith and Granite is exposed over a large part of the central Front Range of Colorado. It is found as far north as the southern slopes of Mount Evans west of Denver, west to South Park, and as far south as Cañon City. The batholith is about 80 miles (130 km) long in the north-south direction and about 25 miles (40 km) wide east to west. Even more of it remains hidden underground.

Mineralogy

The granite ranges in color from light pink to almost red. The pink color is due to large amounts of microcline feldspar and various iron minerals that permeate the rock. The long cooling time and the chemical composition of the original magma allowed large crystals to precipitate out of the magma. As a result, in many places the granite is very coarse grained, made up almost entirely of large crystals of feldspar, typically about a centimeter across. This makes the granite easily weathered and very crumbly. Almost every hill and slope in the Pikes Peak region is covered with thick blankets of loose gravel (scree) made up of marble-sized grains of feldspar.

In some places, the cooling process lasted long enough to form pegmatites that contain large, pure crystals of various minerals. The chemistry of the cooling magma produced a complex and unique mineralogy that attracts collectors from around the world and the Pikes Peak region is famous for its spectacular mineral specimens.

Smoky quartz crystals and topaz are found in many places in the Pikes Peak granite. Probably the most famous mineral from the area is amazonite, a bluish form of microcline feldspar that is relatively rare in other parts of the world. Many museum collections have stunning specimens of deep blue amazonite crystals studded with jet-black smoky quartz crystals.

See also

References

Further reading

1. Granite Tectonics Of Pikes Peak Composite Batholith
Colorado Pegmatite Symposium - 1986
R.M. Hutchinson - Colorado School of Mines

2. Colorado Gem Trails and Mineral Guide
Richard M. Pearl
3rd rev. ed. 1993

3. 

Geology of the Rocky Mountains
Geologic formations of Colorado
Pikes Peak